Moore's Creek State Forest is a 2,353-acre state forest in Rockbridge County, Virginia. Access to the trailhead is via US Forest Service road off State Route 612 in southwestern Rockbridge County.

References
Virginia State Forests website

See also
List of Virginia state forests

 
Virginia state forests
Protected areas of Sussex County, Virginia
2010 establishments in Virginia
Protected areas established in 2010